Samuel Farr may refer to:

 Sam Farr (born 1941), member of the U.S. House of Representatives
 Samuel Farr (architect) (1827–1918), Christchurch architect
 Samuel Farr (physician) (1741–1795), English physician